Provincial Trunk Highway 23 (PTH 23) is a major east-west provincial highway located in the southern portion of the Canadian province of Manitoba. It runs from PTH 21 just south of Hartney to PTH 59 in La Rochelle. Along its route, PTH 23 passes through the communities of Elgin, Ninette, Baldur, Miami, Lowe Farm, and Morris.

History
The original PTH 23 went from Deloraine to Melita. This became part of PTH 3 in 1929.

PTH 23 was designated to its current route in 1950.

When the current route was first added, the highway's western terminus was at PTH 10 near Minto, with the eastern terminus located at PTH 75 in Morris. The highway's eastern terminus was extended to its current location in 1952, and to its current western terminus the following year.

Major intersections

References

External links 
Manitoba Official Map - Southwest
Manitoba Official Map - South Central

023